Galloping On is a 1925 American silent Western film directed by Richard Thorpe and starring Hal Taliaferro, Louise Lester and Slim Whitaker. It was produced by the independent company Action Pictures. Location shooting took place around Julian, California.

Synopsis
Wally Moore returns to his hometown having been wrongly imprisoned after being framed by outlaw Jack Bowers and his ally Banker Brown.

Cast
 Hal Taliaferro as Wally Moore 
 Jessie Cruzon as Helen Jenkins 
 Louise Lester as Mrs. Moore - Wally's Mother
 Slim Whitaker as Jack Bowers
 Richard Belfield as Banker Brown
 Lawrence Underwood as Sheriff Jenkins
 Buck Bucko as Townsman 
 Roy Bucko as Rancher 
 Jim Corey as Henchman 
 Art Phillips as Storekeeper 
 Bud Pope as Deputy 
 Gretchen Waterman as Banker Brown's Young Daughter

References

Bibliography
 Connelly, Robert B. The Silents: Silent Feature Films, 1910-36, Volume 40, Issue 2. December Press, 1998.
 Munden, Kenneth White. The American Film Institute Catalog of Motion Pictures Produced in the United States, Part 1. University of California Press, 1997.

External links
 

1925 films
1925 Western (genre) films
1920s English-language films
American silent feature films
Silent American Western (genre) films
American black-and-white films
Films directed by Richard Thorpe
1920s American films
Films shot in San Diego